Lampeter Velfrey (Welsh: Llanbedr Felfre) is a community and parish in the county of Pembrokeshire, Wales, which lies 68.0 miles (109.4 km) from Cardiff and 196.0 miles (315.4 km) from London. In 2011 the population of the parish was 1,205, with 20.2 per cent of them able to speak Welsh. Besides Lampeter Velfrey village, other settlements in the community include Princes Gate, Ludchurch, Llan-mill, Melinau and Tavernspite.

The old Medieval spelling was "Velfre"

Governance
An electoral ward of the same name exists. This ward stretches beyond the confines of Lampeter Velfrey with a total population of 1,598.

History
The parish was in the former Narberth Hundred, and appeared on a 1578 parish map as Llanbeder Velfray. In the 1830s had a population of 984. Limestone was quarried locally for building and for lime. There was a parochial school in the 1800s. Local historian Geoffrey Morris was rector of Lampeter Velfrey parish until 2008 and wrote a history of the village in 2007. Archives Wales holds a number of historical papers on the village and its former inhabitants.

Worship
The parish church (Church in Wales) of St Peter is a Grade II-listed building, recorded by Cadw in 1971, and was first mentioned in records in 1291. The present church, which may have replaced earlier chapelries, dates from the 13th and 14th centuries and was restored in the 19th and 20th centuries. The bell is dated 1639 and the early Henry Jones organ 1853.

There are two Independent chapels in the village: Bryn Sion (established 1859) and Carfan (established 1804).

See also
List of localities in Wales by population

References

External links

Community Council website
Historical information and further links on GENUKI
Dyfed Family History Society: Information on Lampeter Velfrey churches, chapels and schools

Communities in Pembrokeshire